The Parents for Education (PARED) Foundation in an Australian not-for-profit organisation that has founded and manages several independent Roman Catholic schools in the Australian cities of Sydney, New South Wales and Melbourne, Victoria. PARED was established in 1982 by parents and educators with a focus on operating schools and other educational projects that support parents in their primary role of raising their children. The PARED Foundation has pioneered a one-on-one mentoring system in its schools, and purports to offer an authentic Christian education focused on academic excellence and character development through human virtues.

Overview
The founders of the PARED Schools have introduced into Australia a system of education that was developed in Europe in the 1950s for the parents to exercise greater responsibility in the education of their children. PARED is associated with the Institute of Family Studies of the University of Navarre in Pamplona, Spain.

There are now many such schools in operation on five continents. As of 1993, there were over 150 such schools. PARED maintains contact with many of these schools.

PARED founded Tangara School for Girls in 1982. The school initially had two full-time teachers and 17 students. Since then several other schools and campuses have been established in Sydney's metropolitan region (in Cherrybrook, Dural, Wahroonga, Belfield, Orchard Hills, and Werrington), and in the Melbourne suburb of Narre Warren North.

The Schools in Sydney include Redfield College in Dural, Montgrove College in Orchard Hills, and Wollemi College in Werrington. The schools have chaplains who are priests of Opus Dei, a personal prelature of the Catholic Church.

In the schools' Mentoring system, each student is allocated a mentor who meets the student regularly (ideally fortnightly) to check on the student's advancement academically, socially, spiritually etc. The mentor tends to guide their mentee over a period of years, often all through their schooling life. The parent-mentor meeting replaces numerous parent-teacher interviews throughout the year, with the mentor working closely with the students' teachers to ensure meetings provide practical and current feedback.

The PARED schools
Harkaway Hills College
Montgrove College
Redfield College
Retaval Wahroonga (defunct in 2017)
Retaval Belfield
Tangara School for Girls
Wollemi College

'PARED royalty
'PARED royalty' is a term commonly used within the PARED community to refer to the numerous large families who have attended, or are currently attending, these schools. These families typically have at least four children, but it is not uncommon for the number to exceed eight, nine, ten, or even more. The surnames of these families are often well-known within the community in past and present times, with many having strong intermarriage connections. This has led to a perception of students being in a 'PARED bubble', especially for the boys and girls at Redfield and Tangara. It is not uncommon for Redfield boys to eventually marry their Tangara counterparts, further reinforcing the close-knit nature of the community.

Some of the most famous examples of 'PARED royalty' family surnames in its history include:
 Perrottet
 Tudehope
 Watson
 Burfitt
 Limbers
 Abrams
 Wall
 Boneham

See also

 Catholic education in Australia

References

External links
 The PARED Foundation
 Redfield College
 Tangara School for Girls
 Wollemi College
 Montgrove College
 Harkaway Hills College

Non-profit organisations based in Australia
Educational organisations based in Australia
Opus Dei
1982 establishments in Australia